Li Wei (born 18 March 1985 in Beijing) is a Chinese former football player who played as a midfielder.

Club career
Li Wei was born in Beijing. He moved to Shandong to begin his football career, where he would play for the Shandong Luneng under-19 youth team. With Shandong Luneng comfortably winning the 2006 Chinese Super League title the club's manager Ljubiša Tumbaković allowed Li Wei to graduate to the senior team on October 5, 2006, which he came onto as a substitute against Shanghai Shenhua in a 2-1 defeat. This was his only appearance in the season. It was not until the 2007 league season that saw Li Wei establish himself as a regular member of the Shandong team when he played in seventeen league games for them, which also included his first senior goal on May 9, 2007 in an AFC Champions League group game vs Adelaide United at Jinan. This was followed by his first league goal against Wuhan Guanggu on September 5, 2007 in a 2-0 win. The following season, however, would see Li Wei struggle to remain as a first choice player. Despite winning the 2008 Chinese Super League title with the club he was mainly used as a peripheral squad player within the team. He would continue to be used as a substitute until the introduction of Branko Ivanković as the club's new manager in the 2010 league season. Wei's ability to play in numerous midfield positions saw him gain significantly more playing time under Ivanković's reign and aid Shandong to win another league title.

With the exit of Ivanković, due to poor results within the 2011 AFC Champions League that saw the club eliminated within the group stages, Li's playing time significantly diminished. On 18 February 2013 he would be loaned out to recently promoted top tier club Wuhan Zall. While he immediately established himself as an integral member of the team, he could not aid them from avoiding relegation at the end of the 2013 Chinese Super League. Upon his return to Shandong, Li continued to be a consistent squad member within the team until he left the club in a free transfer to join third tier club Zibo Cuju on 12 June 2019. After one season with the club he left on a free transfer to second tier club Zhejiang on 28 February 2020. After two seasons with the club he would aid them to promotion to the top tier at the end of the 2021 campaign. He would retire from professional football after the 2021 season and move into coaching.

Career statistics
.

Honours

Club
Shandong Luneng
Chinese Super League: 2006, 2008, 2010
Chinese FA Cup: 2006, 2014
Chinese FA Super Cup: 2015

References

External links
Player profile at Shandong Luneng website

Player profile at sodasoccer.com
Player stats at sohu.com

1985 births
Living people
Chinese footballers
Footballers from Beijing
Shandong Taishan F.C. players
Wuhan F.C. players
Zhejiang Professional F.C. players
Chinese Super League players
China League Two players
China League One players
Association football midfielders